Natalia Pokas (born 1 September 1965) is a retired Soviet butterfly swimmer. She won a bronze medal at the 1982 World Aquatics Championships and a silver medal at the 1981 European Aquatics Championships, both in the 4 × 100 m medley relay.

National championships
1981 – 1st in 100 m and 200 m butterfly; 3rd in 4 × 100 m medley.
1983 – 2nd in 100 m butterfly.
1986 – 2nd in 50 m butterfly.

She missed the 1982 championships due to a leg injury.

Masters competitions
After marriage she changed her last name to Matveeva. In the 2000s, she competed in the masters category and won two gold and one silver medals at the world championship in 2010, as well as four gold, one silver and two bronze medals at the European championships of 2007–2011. Nationally, she won eight titles and set 20 records between 2005 and 2008.

References

External links
Profile at Infosport.ru 

1965 births
Living people
Female butterfly swimmers
Soviet female swimmers
European Aquatics Championships medalists in swimming
World Aquatics Championships medalists in swimming